Vladimir Grigoryevich Weisberg (7 June 1924 – 1 January 1985) was a Jewish Russian painter and art theorist.

Weisberg argued that the problems of colourism the way they existed after Cézanne have been exhausted and that the color unsaturated by semi-color carried very little information: any coloristic complexity is the result of the pigment differentiation.  In 1960, Weisberg created a table of the major types of coloristic perception, their signs and structures.

Weisberg art tries to find the synchronicity between semitone, composition, and drawing. His works are exhibited at the Tretyakov Gallery, the Pushkin Museum of Fine Art and many other Russian and foreign museums. Most of his canvasses are scattered among various private collections.

Minor planet 4996 Veisberg was named in his honor in 1986.

References

External links
 http://www.christies.com/lotfinder/lot_details.aspx?pos=4&intObjectID=5146347&sid=
 http://art4.ru/en/news/news_detail.php?ID=1475&block_id=38
 http://www.museum.ru/GMII/vais_1.htm

20th-century Russian painters
Russian male painters
Jewish painters
1924 births
1985 deaths
20th-century Russian male artists